WQRR (101.7 FM, "Alt 101.7") is a radio station serving the Tuscaloosa, Alabama, area with an alternative rock music format. It is under ownership of Townsquare Media.

History
The station was Sign on in 1991, as (WTID). assigned the WBEI call letters by the Federal Communications Commission on January 9, 2003.

In February 2005, Apex Broadcasting Inc. (Houston L. Pearce, chairman) reached an agreement to sell WBEI and six other radio stations in Alabama to Citadel Broadcasting (Farid Suleman, chairman/CEO) for a reported sale price of $29 million. Citadel merged with Cumulus Media on September 16, 2011.

Cumulus sold WBEI and its sister stations to Townsquare Media effective July 31, 2012.

On September 16, 2016, WBEI rebranded as "Star 101.7". While operating manager and afternoon DJ Greg Thomas had left the week before the flip and The Kidd Kraddick Morning Show was dropped with the change, middayer Meg Summers and the syndicated Pop Crush Nights with Lisa Paige remained in place.

On October 17, 2016, Tuscaloosa radio veteran Louie Linguini was hired to host afternoon drive, and reprise his  popular "Saturday Nite Regrind With Louie Linguini" show for the station.

WBEI provided regular weather coverage from WBMA-LD Chief Meteorologist James Spann. During times of active severe, tropical, and Winter weather events, WBEI provided West, Alabama's only live and local weather coverage, with local, in house, Staff Meteorologist Bobby Best.

Additionally, under the ownership of Townsquare Media and the direction of Market President/Chief Revenue Officer David R. Dubose, WBEI also provided West, Alabama radio's only live and local news coverage with News Director Don Hartley and West, Alabama's only live and local traffic coverage with Traffic Reporter Capt'n Ray.

On March 26, 2018, WBEI changed their format from hot adult contemporary to alternative rock, branded as "Alt 101.7". The station changed its call sign to WQRR on March 29, 2018.

Former logos

References

External links
Alt 101.7 WQRR official website

QRR
Radio stations established in 1991
Townsquare Media radio stations
1991 establishments in Alabama
Alternative rock radio stations in the United States